Eilika of Saxony ( – 16 January 1142) was a daughter of Magnus, Duke of Saxony and a member of the Billung dynasty. Through marriage to Otto of Ballenstedt, she was countess of Ballenstedt.

Life
Eilika was the younger daughter of Magnus, Duke of Saxony and Sophia, daughter of King Béla I of Hungary. Since Eilika had no brothers, after her father's death in 1106, Eilika and her sister, Wulfhilde of Saxony, inherited his property. Eilika received property in Bernburg, Weißenfels, Werben and perhaps also in Burgwerden and Kreichau, as well as the Palatinate of Saxony.

In 1130 Eilika was in conflict with the citizens of the city of Halle, probably because of her support for Archbishop Norbert of Magdeburg. Fighting broke out, during which Conrad of Eichstadt was killed, and from which Eilika only escaped with difficulty.  
Around 1131 Eilika wrested the advocacy of the monastery of Goseck (monastery) from Louis of Thuringia, and took it for herself. In 1133 Eilika expelled Abbot Bertold from Goseck for incompetency. In 1134 she introduced his successor, Abbot Penther, to the abbey with a solemn address to the monks. 
In 1138 Eilika was accused of tyranny (tyrannis), and attacked at her castle of Bernburg.

Marriage and children
Eilika married Count Otto of Ballenstedt before 1095. With Otto, Eilika had two children: Albert the Bear and Adelaide of Ballenstedt, who married Henry II, Margrave of the Nordmark.

References

Sources

A. Thiele, Erzählende genealogische Stammtafeln zur europäischen Geschichte" Band I, Teilband 1 Deutsche Kaiser-, Königs-, Herzogs- und Grafenhäuser I
H. Assing, Die frühen Askanier und ihre Frauen (Bernburg, 2002).
L. Partenheimer, Albrecht der Bär. Gründer der Mark Brandenburg und des Fürstentums Anhalt. (Böhlau Verlag Köln Weimar Wien, 2001).

External links
genealogie-mittelalter.de Eilika von Ballenstedt (in German)
Eilika von Sachsen Deutsche Biographie (in German)

1080s births
1142 deaths
Place of birth unknown
Place of death unknown
House of Billung
11th-century German women
11th-century Saxon people
12th-century German women
12th-century Saxon people
German countesses
Daughters of monarchs